Larry Plancke (born ) is a Canadian football player who played for the Edmonton Eskimos.

References

Living people
1940s births
Edmonton Elks players